Rouhani (means "spiritual" and "cleric"), also transliterated as Rowhani and Rohani, is a surname, and may refer to:

 Freddy Rouhani (b. 1963 or 1964), Iranian-American professional poker player
 Fuad Rouhani, former Secretary-General of OPEC
 Gholamreza Rouhani, Iranian poet
 Hassan Rouhani, 7th President of Iran from 2013 to 2021
 Hossein Rouhani, Iranian karateka
 Mansour Rouhani, Pahlavi era politician in Iran
 Sayyid Sadeq Rohani, Iranian Twelver Shia Marja'
 Shahrdad Rouhani, Iranian composer, violinist/pianist, and conductor
 Taghi Rouhani, Iranian radio personality

Persian-language surnames
Occupational surnames